WFRC may refer to:

 WFRC (FM), a radio station (90.5 FM) licensed to Columbus, Georgia, United States
 WKXB (defunct), a defunct radio station (1600 AM) in Reidsville, North Carolina, United States, which previously held the call sign WFRC
 World Fellowship of Reformed Churches, which became part of World Reformed Fellowship